Valby is an unincorporated community in Morrow County, Oregon, United States. Eightmile is along Oregon Route 206 between Condon and Heppner.

In 1983, an article in The Oregonian described the church and congregation as they were then.

References

1897 establishments in Oregon
Populated places established in 1897
Unincorporated communities in Morrow County, Oregon
Unincorporated communities in Oregon